Alisos Canyon is an American Viticultural Area (AVA), located in Santa Barbara County, California due east outside the small town of Los Alamos on U.S 101 and about  south of Santa Maria, was established on August 25, 2020, by the Alcohol and Tobacco Tax and Trade Bureau (TTB). Alisos Canyon Road bisects the region accessing many of its vineyards. The USDA plant hardiness zone for the AVA is 7b.

Terroir 
The distinguishing features of Alisos Canyon include its topography, soil and climate.  The AVA exhibits a unique viticultural influence of the San Antonio Creek Valley which runs directly from the mouth of Alisos and Comasa Canyons to the Pacific Ocean  to the west. The ingress of cooling marine winds and fog along the San Antonio Creek Valley helps define the climate of Alisos Canyon.

Climate
The  marine-influenced climate is also the basic viticultural feature of the Central Coast AVA. The climate of Alisos Canyon is affected by cool marine air which travels into the area via the drainage system of San Antonio Creek. Growing degree day accumulations within the Alisos Canyon are higher than those of the regions to the northwest and southwest, which are closer to the ocean, and lower than those in the more inland regions to the south and east. The region due north of the AVA also has higher growing degree day accumulations due to its location east of ridges and hills which trap warm air and block cool marine air from entering the region. According to the petition, the AVA's location is a “Goldilocks Rhone Zone,” meaning that temperatures  are neither too hot nor too cold for growing Rhone wine varietals such as Syrah, which is the most common varietal grown in the canyon.

Soil
Soils within the Alisos Canyon AVA are primarily derived from weathered sandstone and shale. The most common soils are the Paso Robles Formation and Careaga Sandstone, which comprise 63 percent and 13 percent of the total soils, respectively. High calcium content from shale pebbles increases the thickness of the skins of red varietal wine grapes, which in turn increases the color and tannin levels in the resulting wine. High sand content provides excellent drainage for vineyards, thus reducing the risks from certain pests such as nematodes and phylloxera. The low clay content of Careaga Sandstone soils reduces the uptake of nutrients and reduces the vigor of the vines, resulting in smaller grapes with a higher skin-to-juice ratio than grapes of the same varietal grown in different soils with higher clay content.
To the north of the Alisos Canyon, within the Santa Maria Valley, the soils have sandier top soils. South of the Alisos Canyon, the soils are characterized by Metz fine sandy loam. To the east, the soils are primarily derived from serpentine and chert. To the west of the AVA, the soils are described as deep, sandy soils of the Shedd, Chamise, and Point Sal Formation series.

Wine Industry 
TTB received the petition from Wesley D. Hagen, winemaker of Miller Family Wine Company, on behalf of local vineyard owners and winemakers, proposing the establishment of the “Alisos Canyon” as the seventh AVA in Santa Barbara County. Alisos Canyon lies entirely within the multi-county Central Coast AVA and does not share boundaries with another AVA. In the petition, there is one bonded winery and nine commercially producing vineyards cultivating a total of  within the region's  coverage. According to the petition, the distinguishing features of the proposed Alisos Canyon AVA include its climate and soils. The petition also listed topography and geology as distinguishing features. However, based on the petition's descriptions, topography and geology appear to be too integral to the region's climate and soils, respectively, to be considered separately from those features. Therefore, TTB did not consider topography and geology to be separate distinguishing features of the proposed AVA. The petitioners noted Alisos Canyon as a ‘nascent and narrowly-focused Rhone-focused wine region ready for exploration, only two hours north of Los Angeles and 45 minutes from downtown Santa Barbara’.

References

External links
  Alisos Canyon  Santa Barbara Vintners Association
  TTB AVA Map

American Viticultural Areas of Southern California
American Viticultural Areas
California wine
Geography of Santa Barbara County, California
2014 establishments in California